The 2022 FIFA World Cup qualification AFC–CONMEBOL play-off was a single-leg match between the winner of the AFC fourth round play-off, Australia, and the fifth-placed team from CONMEBOL, Peru. The match was played on 13 June 2022 at the Ahmad bin Ali Stadium in Al Rayyan, Qatar. Australia won 5–4 on penalties following a 0–0 draw after extra time to qualify for the 2022 FIFA World Cup in Qatar.

Background
The draw for the inter-confederation play-off fixtures was held on 26 November 2021.

The match was the second meeting between Australia and Peru. The sides previously met four years earlier in the 2018 FIFA World Cup Group C, with Peru winning 2–0 when La Blanquirroja was already eliminated. Before the match, most football commentators lauded Peru as the better team and had low expectations of Australia, which struggled in the Asian qualifiers.

Match

Summary
The match ended as a scoreless draw. In the 120th minute, Australian goalkeeper Mathew Ryan was subbed off for Andrew Redmayne. During the penalty shoot-out, Redmayne gained notoriety for his dance-like movements, which he used to confuse the Peruvian players. This strategy succeeded, as Redmayne stopped the decisive penalty from Alex Valera diving low to his right-hand side.

Graham Arnold's decision to sub Redmayne in evoked the 2014 FIFA World Cup quarter-final match between Costa Rica and the Netherlands, when Dutch coach Louis van Gaal subbed Jasper Cillessen off for Tim Krul in the 120th minute, as Krul successfully stopped two penalties to eliminate Costa Rica.

Details

Notes

References

External links

Qualifiers, FIFA.com

FIFA World Cup qualification inter-confederation play-offs
World Cup qualification play-off
5
2022 in Asian football
2022 in South American football
Australia national soccer team matches
Peru national football team matches
World Cup qualification play-off
World Cup qualification play-off
International association football competitions hosted by Qatar
World Cup play-off
FIFA World Cup qualification
Sport in Al Rayyan
Fifa World Cup qualification play-off Afc-Conmebol 2022